Annabella Selloni is the David B. Jones Professor of Chemistry at Princeton University.

Education 
Selloni completed studies at the Universitá La Sapienza in 1974 and received her PhD from the Swiss Federal Institute of Technology in Lausanne in 1979.

Career and research 
Selloni works on theoretical chemistry, determining electronic and other properties of materials that are of interest for energy applications. She carries out complex quantum-mechanical computations.

Her research has covered density functional theory investigations into the effects of surface chemistry on water electrocatalysis, modelling of biomaterials capable of purifying water of heavy metals, and studying the interaction between organic and inorganic layers in self-cleaning titanium dioxide.

Her collaborators include Prof. Cristiana Di Valentin at the University of Milano-Bicocca.

Awards and honours 
She was awarded the status of Fellow in the American Physical Society, after being nominated by the Division of Computational Physics in 2008, for her pioneering first-principles computational studies of surfaces and interfaces, which made possible the interpretation of complex experiments, and successfully predicted the physical, and chemical properties of broad classes of materials, including materials for photovoltaic applications.

 Fellow of the European Academy of Sciences (2016)
 Max Planck Fellowship (Fritz-Haber-Institut, Berlin, 2009; July 2013)
 APS Outstanding Referee (2012)
 J. D. Lindsay Lectures Speaker at Texas A&M University (Fall 2012)
 Fellow of the American Physical Society (2008)

References 

Fellows of the American Physical Society
American Physical Society
21st-century American physicists
21st-century American women scientists
American women physicists
Living people
Date of death missing
Year of birth missing (living people)
20th-century Italian physicists
20th-century Italian women scientists